James Robinson Boise (January 27, 1815, Blandford, Massachusetts – February 9, 1895, Chicago) was an American classicist.  He was the author of several Greek text books.

Biography
He graduated from Brown University in 1840, and served there as tutor of Latin and Greek and as a professor of Greek until 1850. In 1852, he became professor of Greek language and literature in the University of Michigan. In 1868, he was called to the same chair in the old University of Chicago.
In 1877, he became professor of New Testament Interpretation in the Baptist Union Theological Seminary. On the establishment of the new University of Chicago, he was made professor emeritus of New Testament Greek.
Robinson Boise was a strong supporter of women's education; his daughter Alice Robinson Boise Wood was the first woman to (informally) attend classes at the University of Michigan in 1866-7 and in 1872 became the first woman to graduate from the Old University of Chicago.

Work
He published several classical text books, including editions with original notes of Xenophon's Anabasis and the first six books of Homer's Iliad, besides notes on the Epistles to the Galatians, Romans, etc.  His texts on the Greek language included Greek Syntax and First Lessons in Greek.

Notes

References

External links
 

1815 births
1895 deaths
American classical scholars
Brown University alumni
Brown University faculty
University of Michigan faculty
University of Chicago faculty
People from Blandford, Massachusetts
19th-century American writers
19th-century American male writers